The 1962 Chicago Bears season was their 43rd regular season completed in the National Football League. The team finished with a 9–5 record, earning them a third-place finish in the NFL Western Conference. This was the first season that the wishbone "C" appeared on the helmets (albeit in white; it would not adopt its more familiar burnt orange color until 1974).

Roster

Schedule

Note: Intra-conference opponents are in bold text.

Season summary

Week 1 at 49ers

Standings

References

Chicago Bears
Chicago Bears seasons
Chicago Bears